Charles Robert Watts (2 June 1941 – 24 August 2021) was an English musician who achieved international fame as the drummer of the Rolling Stones from 1963 until his death in 2021.

Originally trained as a graphic artist, Watts developed an interest in jazz at a young age and joined the band Blues Incorporated. He also started playing drums in London's rhythm and blues clubs, where he met future bandmates Mick Jagger, Keith Richards and Brian Jones. In January 1963, he left Blues Incorporated and joined the Rolling Stones as drummer, while doubling as designer of their record sleeves and tour stages. Watts' first public appearance as a permanent member was in February 1963; he remained with the group for 58 years until his death, at which time he, Jagger and Richards were the only members of the band to have performed on every one of their studio albums.

Nicknamed "The Wembley Whammer" by Jagger, Watts cited jazz as a major influence on his drumming style. Aside from his career with the Rolling Stones, Watts toured with his own group, the Charlie Watts Quintet, and appeared in London at Ronnie Scott's Jazz Club with the Charlie Watts Tentet.

In 1989, Watts was inducted into the Rock and Roll Hall of Fame. In 2004, he was inducted into the UK Music Hall of Fame with the Rolling Stones. He is often regarded as one of the greatest drummers of all time.

Early life
Charles Robert Watts was born at University College Hospital in Bloomsbury, London, to Charles Richard Watts, a lorry driver for the London, Midland and Scottish Railway, and wife Lillian Charlotte (née Eaves), who had been a factory worker. He has a sister, Linda (born 1944), with whom he was close.

As a child, Watts lived in Wembley, at 23 Pilgrims Way. Many of Wembley's houses had been destroyed by Luftwaffe bombs during World War II; Watts and his family lived in a prefab, as did many in the community. Watts would remember little of the Second World War, stating "I heard bombs exploding in the neighbourhood. I remember the mad rush from the house into the air-raid shelters. I was very young. War was something of a game to me - I don't think I ever really and truly got frightened." In 1946, Watts met neighbour Dave Green, who had moved in opposite at 22 Pilgrims Way; they became childhood friends, and remained so until Watts' death. Green became a jazz bass player, and recalls that as boys, "we discovered 78rpm records. Charlie had more records than I did ... We used to go to Charlie's bedroom and just get these records out." Watts' earliest records were jazz recordings; he remembered owning 78 RPM records of Jelly Roll Morton and Charlie Parker. Green recalls that Watts also "had the one with Monk and the Johnny Dodds Trio. Charlie was ahead of me in listening and acquisitions." Green and Watts would become bandmates in many of Charlie's jazz projects.

Watts and his family subsequently moved to Kingsbury, where he attended Tylers Croft Secondary Modern School from 1952 to 1956; as a schoolboy, he displayed a talent for art, music, cricket and football. When he and Green were both about thirteen, Watts became interested in drumming:

Watts' parents gave him his first drum kit in 1955, and he practised drumming along to jazz records he collected. After completing secondary school, Watts enrolled at Harrow Art School (now the Harrow campus of the University of Westminster), which he attended until 1960.

Career

Jazz bands and Blues Incorporated 

After leaving art school, he worked as a graphic designer for an advertising company called Charlie Daniels Studios, and also played drums occasionally with local bands in coffee shops and clubs. He and Green began their musical careers together from 1958 to 1959, playing in a jazz band in Middlesex called the Jo Jones All Stars. Watts initially found his transition to rhythm and blues puzzling: "I went into rhythm and blues. When they asked me to play, I didn't know what it was. I thought it meant Charlie Parker, played slow."

In 1961, Watts met Alexis Korner, who invited him to join his band Blues Incorporated. At that time, Watts was on his way to a sojourn working as a graphic designer in Denmark, but he accepted Korner's offer when he returned to London in February 1962. Watts played regularly with Blues Incorporated and maintained a job with the advertising firm Charles, Hobson and Gray.

Career with the Rolling Stones 

In mid-1962, Watts first met Brian Jones, Ian "Stu" Stewart, Mick Jagger and Keith Richards, who also frequented the London rhythm and blues clubs, but it was not until January 1963 that Watts finally agreed to join the Rolling Stones. Initially, the band could not afford to pay Watts, who had been earning a regular salary from his gigs. His first public appearance as a permanent member was at the Ealing Jazz Club on 2 February 1963. Watts was often introduced as "The Wembley Whammer" by Jagger during live concerts.

Besides his work as a musician, Watts contributed graphic art and comic strips to early Rolling Stones records such as the Between the Buttons record sleeve and was responsible for the 1975 tour announcement press conference in New York City. The band surprised the throng of waiting reporters by driving and playing "Brown Sugar" on the back of a flatbed truck in the middle of Manhattan traffic. Watts remembered this was a common way for New Orleans jazz bands to promote upcoming dates. Moreover, with Jagger, he designed the elaborate stages for tours, first contributing to the lotus-shaped design of the Tour of the Americas, as well as the Steel Wheels/Urban Jungle Tour, the Bridges to Babylon Tour, the Licks Tour, and the A Bigger Bang Tour.

Watts' last live concert with the band was 30 August 2019 at Hard Rock Stadium in Miami, Florida. He had never missed a single concert throughout his career with the band. Besides Jagger and Richards, he is the only member to have appeared on every album in the Rolling Stones discography.

Activities outside the Stones 
Watts was involved in many activities outside his life as a member of the Rolling Stones. In December 1964, he published a cartoon tribute to Charlie Parker titled Ode to a High Flying Bird. Although he made his name in rock, his personal tastes lay principally in jazz.

In the late 1970s, he joined Ian Stewart in the back-to-the-roots boogie-woogie band Rocket 88, which featured many of the UK's top jazz, rock and R&B musicians. In the 1980s, he toured worldwide with a big band – the Charlie Watts Orchestra – that included such names as Evan Parker, Courtney Pine and Jack Bruce, who was also a member of Rocket 88.

In 1991, he organised a jazz quintet as another tribute to Charlie Parker. The year 1993 saw the release of Warm and Tender by the Charlie Watts Quintet, which included vocalist Bernard Fowler. This same group released Long Ago and Far Away in 1996. Both records included a collection of Great American Songbook standards. Following their collaboration on the Rolling Stones' 1997 album Bridges to Babylon, he and drummer Jim Keltner released a techno/instrumental album titled Charlie Watts/Jim Keltner Project. Watts stated that even though the tracks bore such names as the "Elvin Suite" in honour of the late Elvin Jones, Max Roach and Roy Haynes, they were not copying their style of drumming, but rather capturing a feeling by those artists. Watts at Scott's was recorded with his group, "the Charlie Watts Tentet", at the Ronnie Scott's Jazz Club in London.

In April 2009, he began performing with the ABC&D of Boogie Woogie. When asked to join by pianist Ben Waters, he quickly agreed; his only demand being that Dave Green play bass, stating, "If Dave does it, I'll do it."

Personal life and public image
On 14 October 1964, Watts married Shirley Ann Shepherd (11 September 1938 – 16 December 2022), whom he had met before joining the Stones in 1963. The couple had one daughter, Seraphina, born in March 1968, who in turn gave birth to Watts' only grandchild, a girl named Charlotte. They remained married until his death.

Watts lived in Halsdon near Dolton, a rural village in west Devon, where he owned an Arabian horse stud farm.  He also owned a percentage of the Rolling Stones' various corporate entities.

While all the Rolling Stones collected cars, Watts never had a driving licence, preferring to view his cars as beautiful objects. Watts was also a fan of cricket, and had a collection of cricket memorabilia.

Touring and band relationships 
Watts expressed a love–hate attitude towards touring, stating in 2003 that he "loved playing with Keith [Richards] and the band" but "wasn't interested in being a pop idol sitting there with girls screaming". In 1989, the Rolling Stones were inducted into the Rock and Roll Hall of Fame. Watts did not attend the ceremony.

Watts' personal life appeared to be substantially quieter than those of his bandmates and many of his rock-and-roll colleagues; onstage, he seemed to furnish a calm and amused counterpoint to his flamboyant bandmates. Known for his loyalty to Shirley, Watts consistently refused sexual offers from groupies on the road; in Robert Greenfield's STP: A Journey Through America with The Rolling Stones, a documentary of the 1972 American Tour, it is noted that when the group was invited to the Playboy Mansion during that tour, Watts took advantage of Hugh Hefner's game room instead of frolicking with the women. "I've never filled the stereotype of the rock star", he remarked. "Back in the '70s, Bill Wyman and I decided to grow beards, and the effort left us exhausted." In a 1996 interview with Rolling Stone magazine, he said that he had sketched every bed he had slept on while on tour since 1967. By 2001, he had filled 12 to 15 diaries.

One anecdote relates that in the mid-1980s, an intoxicated Jagger phoned Watts' hotel room in the middle of the night, asking, "Where's my drummer?" Watts reportedly got up, shaved, dressed in a suit, put on a tie and freshly shined shoes, descended the stairs, and punched Jagger in the face, saying: "Never call me your drummer again. You're my fucking singer!" He expressed regret for the incident in 2003, attributing his behaviour to alcohol.

Health 
In the mid-1980s, Watts' previously moderate use of alcohol and drugs became excessive. "[They were] my way of dealing with [family problems] ..." he said. "I think it was a mid-life crisis. All I know is that I became totally another person around 1983 and came out of it about 1986. I nearly lost my wife and everything over my behaviour."

Despite having quit smoking in the late 1980s, Watts was diagnosed with throat cancer in June 2004. He underwent a course of radiotherapy and the cancer went into remission. "I went into hospital," Watts recalled, "and eight months later Mick said, 'We're going to do a record. But we'll only do it when you're ready.' They were buggering about, writing songs, and when I was ready I went down and that was it, A Bigger Bang. Then I did a two-year tour. It seems that whenever we stop, I get ill. So maybe I should carry on!"

On 5 August 2021, it was reported that Watts had elected to sit out the resumption of the US No Filter Tour due to a heart surgery and that Steve Jordan would temporarily replace him on drums.

Death and tributes 
Watts died at a London hospital on 24 August 2021, at the age of 80, with his family around him. Watts' bandmates Jagger, Richards and Wood paid tribute to him, along with former bandmate Wyman. Many other celebrities and rock musicians paid tribute to Watts on his death, including Paul McCartney, Ringo Starr, Elton John, Brian Wilson, Pete Townshend, Nick Mason, Roger Daltrey, the members of U2, Bryan Adams, Liam Gallagher, Brian May, Roger Taylor, Kenney Jones, Chad Smith, Questlove and Max Weinberg. For 10 days, the contents of the Rolling Stones' official website were replaced with a single picture of Watts in his memory.

Two days after his death, Jason Isbell and Brittney Spencer dedicated a cover performance of "Gimme Shelter" to Watts. On 27 August, the band's social media accounts shared a video tribute to Watts consisting of a montage of pictures and film footage. The montage was set to the Rolling Stones' 1974 track "If You Can't Rock Me", which opens with the lines "The band's on stage and it's one of those nights ... / The drummer thinks that he is dynamite, oh yeah". Watts was laid to rest in Devon after a small ceremony. An authorised biography was released in October 2022.

On the one year anniversary of Watts' death, Jagger shared what Rolling Stone described as a "moving tribute" on social media, which included a voiceover by Jagger backed with "Till the Next Goodbye".

Accolades

Drumming 

In 1991 The Guardian described Watts as an "heroic yet quaint archetype ... of the 'Rock Drummer', and we are unlikely to hear their like again". The Guardian attributed his professional survival to not ever aspiring for stardom nor forcing himself into songwriting. In the July 2006 issue of Modern Drummer magazine, Watts was voted into the Modern Drummer Hall of Fame, joining Ringo Starr, Keith Moon, Steve Gadd, Buddy Rich and other highly esteemed and influential drummers from the history of rock and jazz. The  music critic Robert Christgau, called Watts "rock's greatest drummer". Unlike in most bands where the other musicians follow the lead of the drummer, Watts followed Richards; according to New York Times critic Michiko Kakutani, that is what "makes the Stones impossible to copy".

He is often regarded as one of the greatest drummers of all time. In 2016, he was ranked 12th on Rolling Stones "100 Greatest Drummers of All Time" list. Variety wrote on the day he died that he was "universally recognized as one of the greatest rock drummers of all time". Music critic Rob Sheffield wrote for Rolling Stone that Watts was "rock's ultimate drum god" who "made the Stones great by conceding nothing to them".

Appearance 
The Daily Telegraph named him one of the World's Best Dressed Men. In 2006, Vanity Fair elected Watts into the International Best Dressed Hall of Fame List.

Discography

With the Rolling Stones
 The Rolling Stones / England's Newest Hit Makers (1964)
 12 X 5 (1964)
 The Rolling Stones No. 2 / The Rolling Stones, Now! (1965)
 Out of Our Heads (1965)
 December's Children (And Everybody's) (1965)
 Aftermath (1966)
 Between the Buttons (1967)
 Their Satanic Majesties Request (1967)
 Beggars Banquet (1968)
 Let It Bleed (1969)
 Sticky Fingers (1971)
 Exile on Main St. (1972)
 Goats Head Soup (1973)
 It's Only Rock 'n Roll (1974)
 Black and Blue (1976)
 Some Girls (1978)
 Emotional Rescue (1980)
 Tattoo You (1981)
 Undercover (1983)
 Dirty Work (1986)
 Steel Wheels (1989)
 Voodoo Lounge (1994)
 Bridges to Babylon (1997)
 A Bigger Bang (2005)
 Blue & Lonesome (2016)

Solo 
 The Charlie Watts Orchestra – Live at Fulham Town Hall (1986, Columbia Records)
 The Charlie Watts Quintet – From One Charlie (1991, Continuum Records)
 The Charlie Watts Quintet – A Tribute to Charlie Parker with Strings (1992, Continuum Records)
 The Charlie Watts Quintet – Warm and Tender (1993, Continuum Records)
 The Charlie Watts Quintet – Long Ago and Far Away (1996, Virgin Records)
 The Charlie Watts-Jim Keltner Project (2000, Cyber Octave Records)
 The Charlie Watts Tentet – Watts at Scott's (2004, Sanctuary Records)
 The ABC&D of Boogie Woogie – The Magic of Boogie Woogie (2010, Vagabond Records)
 The ABC&D of Boogie Woogie – Live in Paris (2012, Eagle Records)
 Charlie Watts meets the Danish Radio Big Band (Live with DR Big Band at Copenhagen 2010) (2017, Impulse! Records)

References

Sources

External links

 Charlie Watts on Drummerworld
 Charlie Watts and the Tentet
 Charlie Watts And Tim Ries On Piano Jazz 2006 NPR
 
 
 

1941 births
2021 deaths
People from Bloomsbury
British rhythm and blues boom musicians
Crossover (music)
English jazz drummers
English rhythm and blues musicians
English rock drummers
English graphic designers
English comics artists
Musicians from London
People from Kingsbury, London
Musicians from Wembley
The Rolling Stones members
English drummers
British male drummers
All-Stars (band) members
Blues Incorporated members
Arabian breeders and trainers
British male jazz musicians